Poompatta is a 1971 Indian Malayalam-language children's film, directed by B. K. Pottekkad (in his debut) and produced by V. M. Sreenivasan. Based on a short story by Karoor Neelakanta Pillai, the film stars Sridevi, Prema, Sankaradi and T. R. Omana. It was released on 12 March 1971. Sridevi won the Kerala State Film Award for Best Child Artist for her performance in this film.

Plot 

Sarada becomes an orphan after her mother dies due to an illness. She is adopted by her stepmother, who ill-treats her.

Cast 
 Sridevi as Sarada
 Roja Ramani as Sumathy
 T. R. Omana as Sumathy's mother
 Prema as Janaki
 Sankaradi as Astrologer
 Paul Vengola
 Master Prabhakar as Prabha
 Nellikode Bhaskaran
 Ragini

Production 
Poompatta is based on a short story by Karoor Neelakanta Pillai, and is the directorial debut of B. K. Pottekkad. It is also Master Prabhakar's first Malayalam film.

Soundtrack 
The music was composed by G. Devarajan with lyrics by Yusufali Kechery.

References

External links 
 
 

1970s children's films
1970s Malayalam-language films
1971 directorial debut films
1971 films
Films based on short fiction
Indian children's films